The 1973 Boston Red Sox season was the 73rd season in the franchise's Major League Baseball history. The Red Sox finished second in the American League East with a record of 89 wins and 73 losses, eight games behind the Baltimore Orioles. The team was managed by Eddie Kasko until he was reassigned at the end of September; third-base coach Eddie Popowski managed the team in their final contest of the season.

Offseason 
 January 18, 1973: Orlando Cepeda was signed as a free agent by the Red Sox.
 March 27, 1973: Phil Gagliano and Andy Kosco were traded by the Red Sox to the Cincinnati Reds for Mel Behney.

Regular season

Season standings

Record vs. opponents

Opening Day lineup 

Source:

Roster

Player statistics

Batting

Starters by position 
Note: Pos = Position; G = Games played; AB = At bats; H = Hits; Avg. = Batting average; HR = Home runs; RBI = Runs batted in

Other batters 
Note: G = Games played; AB = At bats; H = Hits; Avg. = Batting average; HR = Home runs; RBI = Runs batted in

Pitching

Starting pitchers 
Note: G = Games pitched; IP = Innings pitched; W = Wins; L = Losses; ERA = Earned run average; SO = Strikeouts

Other pitchers 
Note: G = Games pitched; IP = Innings pitched; W = Wins; L = Losses; ERA = Earned run average; SO = Strikeouts

Relief pitchers 
Note: G = Games pitched; W = Wins; L = Losses; SV = Saves; ERA = Earned run average; SO = Strikeouts

Statistical leaders 

Source:

Batting 

Source:

Pitching 

Source:

Farm system 

LEAGUE CHAMPIONS: Pawtucket, Winston-Salem

Source:

References

External links 
1973 Boston Red Sox team page at Baseball Reference
1973 Boston Red Sox season at baseball-almanac.com

Boston Red Sox seasons
Boston Red Sox
Boston Red Sox
Red Sox